Joe Vellano (born October 30, 1988) is an American football defensive tackle for the Parma Panthers of the Italian Football League. He played college football at the University of Maryland, and signed with the New England Patriots as an undrafted free agent in 2013. He has also been a member of the Indianapolis Colts, Atlanta Falcons, and Dallas Cowboys.

Vellano is now a member of the Parma Panthers, playing in the Italian Football League since 2019.

College career
Vellano played for the Maryland Terrapins from 2008–2012. He redshirted his first season in 2008. In the 2009 season, he appeared in four games and recorded one tackle. In the 2010 season, he recorded 63 total tackles, 10.5 tackles-for-loss, five sacks, two passes defended, and one forced fumble. In the 2011 season, he recorded 94 total tackles, 7.5 tackles-for-loss, 2.5 sacks, four passes defended, two forced fumbles, one fumble recovery, and one defensive touchdown. In his final collegiate season in 2012, he recorded 61 total tackles, 14 tackles-for-loss, six sacks, and one interception.

Professional career

New England Patriots
On April 30, 2013, Vellano signed with the New England Patriots as an undrafted free agent. In Week 5 against the Cincinnati Bengals, he received his first career start in place of Vince Wilfork, who was placed on injured reserve.

Vellano became a Super Bowl champion on February 1, 2015, helping the Patriots win Super Bowl XLIX over the Seattle Seahawks, 28–24.

On August 31, 2015, the Patriots released Vellano. He was re-signed to the practice squad on September 26, and released again on September 30.

Indianapolis Colts
On December 22, 2015, Vellano signed to the practice squad of the Indianapolis Colts.

Second stint with Patriots
On January 26, 2016, the New England Patriots signed Vellano to a futures contract. On September 3, 2016, he was released by the Patriots as part of final roster cuts.

Atlanta Falcons
On September 6, 2016, Vellano was signed to the Falcons' practice squad due to Adrian Clayborn being put on Injured Reserve. He was promoted to the active roster on January 17, 2017. The Falcons ultimately made Super Bowl LI, but lost to Vellano's former team, the New England Patriots. In the game, Vellano had one total tackle.

On September 2, 2017, Vellano was waived by the Falcons and signed to the practice squad the next day. He was promoted to the active roster on September 21, 2017. He was waived on October 24, 2017.

Dallas Cowboys
On November 8, 2017, Vellano was signed to the Dallas Cowboys' practice squad. He signed a reserve/future contract with the Cowboys on January 1, 2018. He was waived on March 7, 2018.

Parma Panthers
In 2019, Vallano signed and played with the Parma Panthers in the Italian Football League. The Panthers lost in the league playoffs.

Personal life
Vellano was born and raised in Rexford, New York. He graduated from Christian Brothers Academy in 2007.

References

External links
 New England Patriots bio 
 Maryland Terrapins bio

1988 births
Living people
People from Clifton Park, New York
Players of American football from New York (state)
American football defensive tackles
Maryland Terrapins football players
New England Patriots players
Indianapolis Colts players
Atlanta Falcons players
Dallas Cowboys players
American expatriate sportspeople in Italy
American expatriate players of American football